Hester Adrienne Henriëtte baroness d'Aulnis de Bourouill (The Hague, 3 September 1920 – 29 December 1996) was a Dutch lawyer who dealt mainly with medical ethical issues.

D'Aulnis de Bourouill was co-founder of the Dutch Foundation for Voluntary Euthanasia (NVVE) and was secretary until 1985, when the foundation was dissolved. For her contributions, she was appointed Officer in the Order of Orange-Nassau.

References

1920 births
1996 deaths
20th-century Dutch lawyers
Dutch women lawyers
20th-century women lawyers